Gazmeh (also known as Deh Gazma) is a village in Margan Rural District, in the Central District of Hirmand County, Sistan and Baluchestan Province, Iran. At the 2006 census, its population was 124, in 25 families.

References 

Populated places in Hirmand County